Set Free is a 1927 American silent Western film directed by Arthur Rosson and starring Art Acord, Olive Hasbrouck and Claude Payton.

Cast
 Art Acord as 'Side Show' Saunders
 Olive Hasbrouck as Holly Farrell
 Claude Payton as Burke Tanner
 Robert McKenzie as Sam Cole 
 Harry Tenbrook as Jim Hart
 Gloria Davenport as Josephine Dokes
 Curley Witzel as Henchman
 Buck Moulton as Hicks
 Fred Burns as Hale
 Jess Deffenbach as Deputy Sheriff

References

Bibliography
 Robert B. Connelly. The Silents: Silent Feature Films, 1910-36, Volume 40, Issue 2. December Press, 1998.

External links
 

1927 films
1927 Western (genre) films
American black-and-white films
Universal Pictures films
Films directed by Arthur Rosson
Silent American Western (genre) films
1920s English-language films
1920s American films